Eduard Darbinyan (born 17 January 1971 in Yerevan, Armenian SSR) is an Armenian retired weightlifter. He competed at the 1996 Summer Olympics in the men's 64 kg division.

References

External links
Sports-Reference.com

1971 births
Living people
Sportspeople from Yerevan
Armenian male weightlifters
Olympic weightlifters of Armenia
Weightlifters at the 1996 Summer Olympics
20th-century Armenian people